This list of museums in Hertfordshire, England contains museums which are defined for this context as institutions (including nonprofit organizations, government entities, and private businesses) that collect and care for objects of cultural, artistic, scientific, or historical interest and make their collections or related exhibits available for public viewing. Also included are non-profit art galleries and university art galleries.  Museums that exist only in cyberspace (i.e., virtual museums) are not included.

Defunct museums
 Buntingford Heritage Centre, Buntingford
 Hitchin Museum and Art Gallery, Hitchin, closed in 2012, collections transferred to North Hertfordshire Museum
 Kingsbury Watermill, no longer a museum, now a restaurant
 Letchworth Museum & Art Gallery, Letchworth, closed in 2012, collections transferred to North Hertfordshire Museum

See also
 :Category:Tourist attractions in Hertfordshire

References

Hertfordshire Museums - partnership of county museums
Hertfordshire Council: Local museums

 
Hertfordshire
Museums